Ezekiel Magolyo Maige (born 28 March 1970) is a Tanzanian CCM politician and Member of Parliament for Msalala constituency since 2005.

References

1970 births
Living people
Tanzanian accountants
Chama Cha Mapinduzi MPs
Tanzanian MPs 2005–2010
Tanzanian MPs 2010–2015
Arusha Secondary School alumni
Shinyanga Secondary School alumni
Institute of Finance Management alumni
Alumni of the University of Leicester